The Miser's Heart is a 1911 American short silent drama film directed by D. W. Griffith and starring Blanche Sweet. The film was shot in Fort Lee, New Jersey where early film studios in America's first motion picture industry were based at the beginning of the 20th century. A print of the film survives.

Cast
 Linda Arvidson as Kathy's Mother
 Lionel Barrymore as Jules, the Thief
 William J. Butler as Policeman
 Donald Crisp as Policeman
 Adele DeGarde as Neighbor
 Edward Dillon as Down-and-Out Young Man
 Frank Evans as Policeman
 Edith Haldeman as The Little Child
 Robert Harron as Bakeshop Assistant
 Adolph Lestina as The Miser
 Wilfred Lucas as First Crook
 Charles Hill Mailes as Second Crook
 Alfred Paget as Policeman
 W. C. Robinson as In Front of Clothing Store
 Ynez Seabury as Little Kathy
 Blanche Sweet as Neighbor
 Kate Toncray as The Woman
 J. Waltham as On Street

See also
 D. W. Griffith filmography
 Blanche Sweet filmography
 Lionel Barrymore filmography

References

External links
 
 

1911 films
1911 short films
1911 drama films
Silent American drama films
American silent short films
American black-and-white films
Biograph Company films
Films directed by D. W. Griffith
Films shot in Fort Lee, New Jersey
1910s American films